Dakbaksho ( Daak-Baksho, meaning The Letter Box) is an Indian psychological thriller film directed by Prosenjit Choudhury. The film stars Supriti Choudhury, Satrajit Sarkar and Pradip Roy in principal roles. The film was released on 26 June 2015.

Synopsis 
Telegram services has been shut down for ever. Postal service is waiting for the death knell as well. At this time, one starts dropping letters in a letter box, which has been abandoned for many years. These letters carry no addresses on them. The contents of the letters are suspicious and clearly indicate a conspiracy; a sinister one, to murder someone.

Parallelly, for a reason unknown, perhaps political interference, Srija, a renowned documentary filmmaker, detaches herself from her job, while a mysterious photographer makes way into her house. As the dark recesses of the characters are revealed the audience is hurled into a tale of deception, horror and faced with questions regarding the identity of the girl, the intentions of the photographer and finally how is all this related to a letter box?

And a game begins, a mystery unfolds.

Cast
 Supriti Choudhury as Srija: a young Bengali documentary filmmaker
 Satrajit sarkar as Avro: a mysterious photographer
 Pradip Roy as The Old man: an elderly mysterious figure who seems to be conducting a grave mission
 Pradip Moulik as Barunda: Srija's friend
 Subrata Chokroborty as Ambar: Srija's Husband
 Bitan Biswas
 Nibedita Nag Tahabildar
 Ruby Santra
 Priya Dutta
 Pubali Saha
 Ilika Bandyopadhyay as Ambar's Mistress
 Prosenjit Choudhury: Cameo 
 Abhijit Choudhury
 Debopriya Roy
 Tapan Bhattacharya
 Nasir Mallick
 Amit Mahato
 Batuk Mukherkee

Production

Development
Dakbaksho, for Prosenjit Choudhury, is an effort to create a visual story out of Shakti Chattopadhyay's famous poem "Postman in the Autumn's wood". The biggest challenge was to create the silence out of all the cacophonies, to search the pain and emptiness out of all the drama, humour and thrill of the story.

Filming
Shooting for the film began in 2013. Although most of the film is shot in Kolkata a considerable part was shot in Mandarmani, Digha, Talsari & Ichapore.

Music
The music for the film has been composed by Prosenjit Choudhury with help from Satrajit sarkar, Abhijit choudhury and Mainak Bhowmik.
The songs, including 'Kakeder Gaan' & 'Shopno Dekhi Shopno Dekhao Tai' are voiced by Manomoy Bhattacharya, Rupankar, Mom, Sunetra & #Abhikism.

Release
The film was released in India in June 2015.

References

External links
 
 Official Facebook Page
 Times of India News

2015 films
2015 psychological thriller films
Films shot in Kolkata
Films set in Kolkata
Bengali-language Indian films
2010s Bengali-language films
Indian psychological thriller films